The Lancashire Book of the Year (previously Lancashire Children's Book of the Year) is an award given to works of children's literature, voted for by a panel of young judges. It was established in 1986 with the first award presented the following year. The award is run by Lancashire County Council's library service and sponsored by the University of Central Lancashire.

List of prize winners
2022 Cynthia Murphy, Last One To Die
2021 Ben Oliver, The Loop
2020 Samuel Pollen, The Year I Didn't Eat
2019 Sarah Crossan, Moonrise
2018 Sue Wallman, See How They Lie
2017 Natalie Flynn, The Deepest Cut
2016 Holly Bourne, Am I Normal Yet
2015 Sarah Mussi, Riot
2014 Cat Clarke, Undone
2013 David Massey, Torn
2012 Chris Higgins, He's After Me
2011 Keren David, When I Was Joe
2010 Narinder Dhami, Bang, Bang, You're Dead
2009
 First place: Sophie McKenzie, Blood Ties
 Second place: Michelle Magorian, Just Henry
 Third place: Sarah Wray, The Trap
2008 Lucas och Viktor, Fearless
2007 Robert Muchamore, CHERUB: Divine Madness
2006 Anthony Horowitz, Raven's Gate
2005 Jonathan Stroud, The Amulet of Samarkand
2004 Chris Wooding, Poison
2003 Julie Bertagna, Exodus
2002 Malorie Blackman, Noughts & Crosses
2001 Joint Winners:
Melvin Burgess, Bloodtide
Malcolm Rose, Plague
2000 Tim Bowler, Shadows
1999 Nigel Hinton, Out of the Darkness
1998 Elizabeth Laird, Jay
1997 Elizabeth Hawkins, Sea of Peril
1996 Frances Mary Hendry, Chandra
1995 Garry Kilworth, The Electric Kid
1994 Ian Strachan, The Boy in the Bubble
1993 Joint Winners:
Brian Jacques, Salamandastron
Robert Westall, Gulf
1992 Robin Jarvis, The Whitby Witches
1991 Brian Jacques, Mattimeo
1990 Jean Ure, Plague 99
1989 Anthony Horowitz, Groosham Grange
1988 Brian Jacques, Redwall
1987 Philip Pullman, The Ruby in the Smoke

References

External links

Lancashire Book of the Year, official website

British children's literary awards
Lancashire
Awards established in 1986
1986 establishments in the United Kingdom